MA-10 may refer to:

 
 Massachusetts Route 10
 Mercury-Atlas 10, a cancelled spaceflight of Project Mercury
 MA-10 cell, a Leydig cell tumour cell line